The Jayu Motorway (also called Jayu-ro, lit. Freedom Road) is a major north–south arterial highway in South Korea. Its southern terminus is in Seoul, while its northern terminus is at National Route 1's Reunification Bridge leading into the DMZ. North Korea is visible from a section of the highway stretching from Seongdong-ri to Ogeum-ri. Its shape closely parallels the northern bank of the Han River and is heavily fortified with barbed wire and military observatories. It is part of National Route 77.

The highway is directly connected with the Gangbyeonbuk-ro at Gayang Bridge.

History
 May 19, 1990 - Construction Begin
 August, 1992 - Haengju Bridge~Tongil observatory section(29 km) opens to traffic.
 September, 1994 - Tongil observatory~Jayu Bridge(자유의다리) section(17.5 km) opens to traffic.

Compositions

Lanes 
 Dangdong IC ~ Jayu IC: 4
 Nakha IC - Dangdong IC: 6
 Nakha IC - Isanpo JC: 8
 Gayang Bridge - Isanpo JC: 10

Length

Speed limits
 90 km/h

List of facilities 
 IC: Interchange, JC: Junction, SA: Service Area, TG:Tollgate

Jayuro Ghost

The highway is also notable for its variant of the vanishing hitchhiker called the Jayuro Ghost. The area frequently experiences foggy weather and thus has a high rate of automobile collisions. According to the narrative, a woman can sometimes be seen along the side of the road wearing sunglasses. Upon closer inspection it is revealed that the so-called sunglasses are actually the woman's gouged-out eyes. Another version of the narrative has a driver picking up the ghost, only for the ghost to direct the driver to a cemetery or disappear when the driver reaches the destination. The Dark Side of Seoul Podcast released a video episode about this urban legend and other road-related Korean folklore.

See also
List of streets in Seoul
Olympicdaero
Gimpo Hangang Highway

References

1992 establishments in South Korea
Roads in Seoul
Roads in Gyeonggi